Phyllodoce empetriformis, the pink mountain-heather or pink mountain-heath, is found in mountainous regions of western North America in the Northwestern United States and Western Canada. Its southern range includes the Klamath Range in northern California and Oregon.

Phyllodoce empetriformis is a low matting shrub with distinctive leaves which roll under themselves so tightly they resemble pine needles. It bears attractive flowers in shades of pink and purple.

It is one of the parents of the artificial hybrid × Phyllothamnus erectus, the other being Rhodothamnus chamaecistus.

Description
This common (in its native bioregion) evergreen alpine shrub bears its red-purple flower clustered at the end of the stem in leaf axils. The flowers of Phyllodoce glanduliflora, for comparison, are yellow or green-white. In Phyllodoce empetriformis, the campanulate corolla is twice as long as the calyx (compared to Phyllodoce gladuliflora, which has a corolla just barely twice as long as the calyx and is urn-shaped). Its sepals and filaments are glabrous or barely hairy (compared to Phyllodoce glanduliflora which has pubescent sepals and filaments).

References

External links

Jepson Manual Treatment
USDA Plants Profile
Photo gallery

Ericoideae
Flora of the Northwestern United States
Flora of Western Canada
Flora of Alaska
Flora of California
Flora of Oregon
Flora without expected TNC conservation status